O-2372 is an analgesic cannabinoid derivative created by Organix Inc. for use in scientific research. It has high affinity for both CB1 and CB2 receptors, with Ki values of 1.3 nM at CB1 and 0.57 nM at CB2, but is only moderately soluble in water compared to other related compounds such as O-2694, which it is a metabolite of.

See also
 O-2113
 O-2545
 O-2694

References

Cannabinoids
Benzochromenes
Phenols